Benedicte Hundevadt (1829 - 1883), was a Norwegian stage actress and concert singer.

Benedicte Hundevadt was engaged at the Det norske Theater (Bergen) in 1850-1854, Christiania Norwegian Theatre 1855-60 and Christiania Theatre temporary in 1861, after which she was active as a successful concert singer.

References 

 Jensson, Liv 1981: Biografisk skuespillerleksikon. Norske, danske og svenske skuespillere på norske scener særlig på 1800-tallet. Oslo: Universitetsforlaget. .

1829 births
1883 deaths
19th-century Norwegian actresses
19th-century Norwegian women singers